Ceratophyus is a genus of earth-boring scarab beetles in the family Geotrupidae. There are about 13 described species in Ceratophyus.

Species
These 13 species belong to the genus Ceratophyus:

 Ceratophyus alloini Prunier, Tauzin & Rosset, 2016
 Ceratophyus dauricus (Jekel, 1865)
 Ceratophyus gopherinus Cartwright, 1966 (gopher beetle)
 Ceratophyus hoffmannseggi (Fairmaire, 1856)
 Ceratophyus kabaki Nikolajev, 2007
 Ceratophyus maghrebinicus Hillert & Kral, 2013
 Ceratophyus martinezi Lauffer, 1909
 Ceratophyus mesasiaticus Medvedev & Nikolajev, 1974
 Ceratophyus polyceros (Pallas, 1771)
 Ceratophyus rossii (Jekel, 1865)
 Ceratophyus schaffrathi Hillert & Kral, 2013
 Ceratophyus sinicus Zunino, 1973
 Ceratophyus sulcicornis (Fairmaire, 1887)

References

Further reading

External links

 

Geotrupidae
Articles created by Qbugbot